The Hong Kong women's national squash team represents Hong Kong in international squash team competitions, and is governed by Hong Kong Squash.

Since 1985, Hong Kong has won a bronze medal in 2016.

Current team
 Chan Sin Yuk
 Ho Tze Lok
 Lee Ka Yi
 Tong Tsz Wing
 Cheng Nga Ching
 Fung Ching Hei, Heylie

Former Team Members
 Rebecca Chiu
 Mak Pui Hin, Christina
 Ng Jia Yunn Elise
 Annie Au
 Joey Chan
 Chan Pui Hei, Pansy
 Ho Ka Po
 Liu Tsz Ling
 Chu Man Yee Vanessa

Results

World Team Squash Championships

Asian Squash Team Championships

References

See also 
 Hong Kong Squash
 World Team Squash Championships
 Hong Kong men's national squash team

Squash teams
Women's national squash teams
Squash